The 2020 New Hampshire gubernatorial election was held on November 3, 2020, to elect the governor of New Hampshire. Incumbent Republican Governor Chris Sununu was re-elected to a third two-year term in office, defeating his opponent Dan Feltes, the Majority Leader of the Senate. Nine governors ran for re-election in this cycle and all nine were re-elected. Sununu's win marked the first time since 1986 that a Republican was elected to a third term as governor, in which his father, John H. Sununu was reelected for his third and final term. The elder Sununu chose not to seek reelection in 1988, instead becoming George H.W. Bush's chief of staff in 1989.

Sununu became the first person ever to get more than half a million votes in a New Hampshire gubernatorial election, making him the top vote-getter in the history of statewide elections in the state.

Republican primary

Candidates

Nominee
Chris Sununu, incumbent Governor of New Hampshire

Eliminated in primary
Karen Testerman, Franklin city councilor
Nobody, activist formerly known as Rich Paul

Declined
Kelly Ayotte, former U.S. Senator
Frank Edelblut, commissioner of the New Hampshire Department of Education and candidate for governor in 2016
Chuck Morse, minority leader of the New Hampshire Senate

Polling

Results

Democratic primary

Candidates

Nominee
Dan Feltes, majority leader of the New Hampshire Senate

Eliminated in primary
Andru Volinsky, member of the Executive Council of New Hampshire

Declined
Joyce Craig, mayor of Manchester
Molly Kelly, former state senator and nominee for Governor of New Hampshire in 2018
Steve Marchand, former mayor of Portsmouth and candidate for Governor of New Hampshire in 2016 and 2018
Mindi Messmer, former state representative and candidate for New Hampshire's 1st congressional district in 2018 (running for Executive Council)

Endorsements

Polling

Results

Other candidates

Libertarian Party

Nominee
 Darryl W. Perry, author and candidate for U.S. president in 2016

Independent

Did not qualify for the ballot
 Bill Fortune

General election

Predictions

Endorsements

Polling

with Andru Volinsky

Results

 

Counties that flipped from Democratic to Republican
 Cheshire (largest municipality: Keene)
 Grafton (largest municipality: Lebanon)
 Strafford (largest municipality: Dover)

See also
 2020 New Hampshire elections

Notes

References

External links
 
 
  (State affiliate of the U.S. League of Women Voters)
 

Official campaign websites
 Dan Feltes (D) for Governor
 Darryl W. Perry (L) for Governor
 Chris Sununu (R) for Governor

2020
Governor
New Hampshire